Fernando Cotoner y Chacón (1817-1888), 1st marqués de la Cenia, Lieutenant at the Carlist Wars, Governor of Puerto Rico, interim Minister of War and Director general of the Civil Guard.Captain General of the Balearic Islands. Senator for life for the Balearic Islands.

References

House of Cotoner